Garaik (also Romanized as Garā’īk) is a village in Byaban Rural District, Byaban District, Minab County, Hormozgan Province, Iran. At the 2006 census, its population was 291, in 45 families.

References 

Populated places in Minab County